The Oklahoma Victory Dolls (OKVD) is a flat-track roller derby league based in Oklahoma City, Oklahoma. Founded in 2007, the league currently consists of two competitive teams which compete internationally against teams from other leagues, as well as home teams.   

The current league is a result of two previous mergers:  with the OKC Outlaws in 2015, and Oklahoma City Roller Derby in 2016.  The league originally consisted of four home teams that competed against each other.  Oklahoma Victory Dolls is a member of the Women's Flat Track Derby Association (WFTDA).

History
As a 501(c)3 non-profit organization, the Victory Dolls donate a portion of their profits to local charities and have also organized fundraisers for injured skaters. They frequently volunteer for local charities and non-profits, and are regularly a part of local pride events. 

In January 2017, the league announced it was merging with Oklahoma City Roller Derby and the new organization would continue under the Oklahoma Victory Dolls name.

In March of 2020, OKVD, along with all other WFTDA-sanctioned leagues, took a hiatus from practice and gameplay due to the Covid-19 pandemic.

In June 2021, OKVD restarted practices, in compliance with the WFTDA return-to-play guidelines for sanctioned leagues.  Intra-league gameplay remains on the horizon.

Oklahoma City Roller Derby

Oklahoma City Roller Derby (OKCRD) was founded by eight local women in March 2006 as the "Tornado Alley Rollergirls".  More skaters joined in April, and the league grew rapidly. By the end of the year, the league already had four teams comprising a total of around 40 skaters, and was bouting regularly. However, in 2007, the majority of two of the teams left the league: most of the Cell Block 9 team founding the Red Dirt Rebellion banked track league, and most of the Victory Dolls forming the Oklahoma Victory Dolls league. In 2008, the league adopted the Oklahoma City Roller Derby name, with Tornado Alley Rollergirls becoming a team name. It was accepted into the Women's Flat Track Derby Association Apprentice Program in July 2010, and became a full member of the WFTDA in March 2011.

WFTDA rankings as OKCRD

Oklahoma Victory Dolls
The Oklahoma Victory Dolls were the youngest league to be accepted as full members of the Women's Flat Track Derby Association (WFTDA) at the time of their induction in September 2008. They were a part of the South Central Region of the WFTDA from 2008 to 2012. When the WFTDA changed to a Divisions-based ranking system in 2013, the Oklahoma Victory Dolls debuted in Division 2, ranked at 55.

WFTDA competition
In 2013, Oklahoma Victory Dolls first qualified for WFTDA Playoffs, entering the Division 1 tournament in Asheville, North Carolina as the ninth seed, and taking seventh place with a 200-131 victory over the Nashville Rollergirls. As the eighth seed in Salt Lake City in 2014, Oklahoma finished in tenth place with an overtime loss to Tri-City Roller Derby, 190-185. In 2015, Oklahoma City dropped into Division 2 Playoffs in Cleveland as the ninth seed and came out in eighth place after a 179-137 loss to Jet City Rollergirls of Everett, Washington. OKVD returned to Playoffs for the Division 2 Playoffs and Championship in 2017 as the fifth seed in Pittsburgh, and finished the weekend in seventh place.

Rankings

References

Sports in Oklahoma City
Roller derby leagues established in 2007
Roller derby leagues in Oklahoma
Women's Flat Track Derby Association Division 2
2007 establishments in Oklahoma